Jason Patraj (born 26 July 1981) is a cricketer who has played two One Day Internationals for Canada.

External links 

1981 births
Living people
Canada One Day International cricketers
Canadian cricketers
Canadian people of Indian descent
Cricketers from Ontario
Sportspeople from Toronto